Cevat Yerli (born 1978 in Coburg, Germany to Turkish immigrants from Giresun) is a computer game developer. He co-founded Crytek, one of the largest video game developers in Germany, and served as its CEO and President until February 2018.

Crytek 

Yerli founded Crytek in 1997 and formally turned it into a company in 1999. His brothers, Faruk and Avni, joined Crytek in 2000 and 2001, respectively. The company developed games such as Far Cry and the Crysis series. Yerli was the director and executive producer on nearly all games until stepping down on the 28th of February 2018.

Games created

References 

1978 births
German video game designers
Living people
People from Coburg
German people of Turkish descent